Toonerville may refer to:

 Toonerville Folks, a 20th-century comic strip
 Toonerville, Colorado, an unincorporated community
 Toonerville, Kentucky, an unincorporated community
 Toonerville, Missouri, an unincorporated community
 Toonerville, Pennsylvania, an unincorporated community